Spencer Creaghan is a Canadian musician and composer. He is most noted for his work on the 2021 film Motherly, for which he received a Canadian Screen Award nomination for Best Original Score at the 10th Canadian Screen Awards in 2022.

His other credits have included the films Black Water and Quickening, the web series Teenagers and the television drama series SurrealEstate. He has also composed orchestral parts for symphonic metal bands, including Devilment, Astaroth, Diamorte and Lindsay Schoolcraft.

He is an alumnus of the Slaight Family Music Lab at the Canadian Film Centre.

References

External links

21st-century Canadian composers
Canadian film score composers
Canadian Film Centre alumni
Living people
Year of birth missing (living people)